Zafaraniyeh (also Romanized as Zaʿfarānīyeh) is a village in Ramjin Rural District, Chaharbagh District, Savojbolagh County, Alborz Province, Iran. At the 2006 census, its population was 107, in 34 families.

References 

Populated places in Savojbolagh County